Diogo Miguel Ribeiro Gomes (born 6 October 2000) is a Portuguese footballer who plays for São João de Ver as a midfielder.

Football career
He made his professional debut for Leixões on 28 September 2020 in the Liga Portugal 2.

References

External links

2000 births
Sportspeople from Matosinhos
Living people
Portuguese footballers
Association football midfielders
Leixões S.C. players
C.D.C. Montalegre players
SC São João de Ver players
Liga Portugal 2 players